Cobra is a 1991 Pakistani Punjabi-language action thriller film directed by Shahid Rana and produced by Malik Saleem, starring Sultan Rahi, Gori, Ghulam Mohiuddin, Nadira, Abid Ali, Asif Khan and Humayun Qureshi. The film is a remake of 1978's Indian film Don, starring Amitabh Bachchan. Sultan Rahi portrays dual roles as Cobra and Stuntman Akbar Khan.

Synopsis
Inspector Khan (Abid Ali) is in pursuit of crime boss Cobra (Sultan Rahi) and his gang. When Cobra gets killed in a police encounter, Inspector Khan trains his lookalike to pose as gang boss and help nab his gang.

Cast
 Sultan Rahi as Cobra / Akbar Khan (double role)
 Gori as Maria
 Ghulam Mohiuddin as Inspector Arshad
 Nadira as Uzmaa
 Humayun Qureshi as Dr. Diyang
 Abid Ali as Inspector Khan
 Asif Khan as DIG Police / Chief
 Naghma as Akbar's mother
 Salma Agha as Singer Salma (Guest Appearance)

Soundtrack

References

External links
 

1990s crime action films
Pakistani crime action films
1991 films
Punjabi-language Pakistani films
Pakistani remakes of Indian films
1991 directorial debut films
Films about lookalikes